The Ministry of Defence and National Service (MODANS) is the government ministry of Tanzania that is responsible for defense and national service.

References

External links
 

D
Tanzania
Military of Tanzania